Koo Jun-hoe (born March 31, 1997), also known by the stage name Ju-ne, is a South Korean singer and member of boy group iKon under 143 Entertainment. He has made appearances on survival programs WIN: Who Is Next and Mix & Match in 2013 and 2014 respectively.

Biography

Early life 
Koo Jun-hoe was born on March 31, 1997 in Seoul, South Korea. In March 2009, he made his first television appearance on SBS' Star King as "13 year old Michael Jackson".  In 2011, Jun-hoe appeared on the first season of SBS' K-pop Star. Following elimination from the show, in April 2012 he was scouted by YG Entertainment and joined the company as a trainee.

2013–present: WIN: Who Is Next, Mix & Match and iKon

In 2013 Jun-hoe joined Mnet reality survival program WIN: Who Is Next as a member of Team B. The show ended with Team A winning and going on to debut as Winner, and Team B returning to train under the YG label. Soon after, in 2014, YG Entertainment announced the members of Team B would be competing again in a second reality survival show, Mix & Match. The show resulted in the debut of all Team B members alongside Jung Chan-woo under the name iKon.

On September 15, 2015 iKon debuted the pre-release single "My Type", following soon after with the lead singles "Rhythm Ta" and "Airplane", with Jun-hoe participating in the production for "Rhythm Ta". On October 4, 2015 iKon made their first music show appearance on SBS' Inkigayo, simultaneously receiving their third win for single "My Type".

Discography

Charted songs

Composition credits

Filmography

Film

Television series

Television shows

Awards and nominations

References

External links

 
 
 
 

1997 births
Living people
South Korean male singers
South Korean pop singers
South Korean male idols
K-pop singers
K-pop Star participants
YG Entertainment artists
IKon members
21st-century South Korean singers
Singers from Seoul